Willie Harvey Jr. (born January 9, 1996) is an American football linebacker for the St. Louis BattleHawks of the XFL. He played college football at Iowa State.

Early years 
Harvey grew up in Hastings, Florida. He attended Pedro Menendez High School, where he played linebacker as a senior, recording 131 tackles, including 49 solo stops, four sacks and three forced fumbles as a senior. Harvey was named first-team all-state by the Sun Sentinel and a Class 5A Elite all-state team member.

College career 
Harvey played for the Iowa State Cyclones from 2014 to 2018 at all three linebacker spots. After redshirting in 2014, he started eight of 12 games played as a RS Freshman, finishing fourth on the team in tackles with 59. He started nine of 12 games played his sophomore season, where he tied for the team lead in tackles (78) and ranked second on the team in both TFL (7.5) and sacks (3.0). Harvey was named Honorable Mention All-Big 12. Harvey started all 12 games played at outside linebacker as a junior, where he posted 76 tackles and ranked second on the team in TFL (11.5), fourth in sacks (4.0), and had an interception, forced fumble, fumble recovery and five pass breakups. He was once again named Honorable Mention All-Big 12 following his junior season. In 2018, Harvey started all 13 games at outside linebacker, where he finished second on the team in tackles (76), tied for second in TFL (9.0) and second on the team in sacks (3.5). Harvey was named Honorable Mention All-Big 12 for the third straight season. Harvey was selected to participate in the NFLPA Collegiate Bowl in January 2019.

Professional career

Cleveland Browns 
Although he received draftable grades by a few NFL teams, Harvey ended up signing as an undrafted free agent by the Cleveland Browns after the 2019 NFL Draft. He was waived by the Browns on August 31, 2019 and was signed to the practice squad the next day. He was promoted to the active roster on September 21, 2019.

Harvey was waived by the Browns on September 5, 2020.

The Browns re-signed Harvey on August 20, 2021. Harvey was waived by the Browns on August 31, 2021.

The Browns re-signed Harvey for a third time on December 18, 2021, following 20+ positive COVID-19 tests on the Browns active roster. He was waived on January 8, 2022. He signed a reserve/futures contract with the Browns on January 11, 2022. Harvey was waived by the Browns on August 30, 2022.

St. Louis BattleHawks 
On November 17, 2022, Harvey was drafted by the St. Louis BattleHawks of the XFL.

References 

1996 births
Living people
African-American players of American football
American football offensive linemen
Cleveland Browns players
Iowa State Cyclones football players
People from St. Johns County, Florida
Players of American football from Florida
St. Louis BattleHawks players
21st-century African-American sportspeople